Sébastien Mathieu Corchia (born 1 November 1990) is a French professional footballer who plays as a right-back for Nantes.

A French international, he gained one cap in 2016. Due to his French and Italian ancestry, Corchia holds dual nationality.

Club career

Early career
Corchia was born in Noisy-le-Sec, Seine-Saint-Denis and started his career with hometown club Stade Olympique de Rosny-sous-Bois Football. After a two-year stint at the club, he joined semi-professional outfit Villemomble Sports. Corchia spent five years at the club, and in 2003, was selected to attend the prestigious Clairefontaine academy. While training at Clairefontaine during the week, Corchia played with amateur club AS Bondy on the weekends. Shortly before the end of his tenure at Clairefontaine, he also trained at the Camp des Loges, the youth training center of Paris Saint-Germain.

Le Mans
After his departure from the academy, Corchia joined Le Mans on an aspirant (youth) contract. His performances with Le Mans's Championnat de France amateur team and France's international youth teams led to interest from Serie A club Juventus and Premier League club Arsenal. Corchia remained in Le Mans's youth system until receiving his first call up to the senior squad on 14 February 2009 for the team's league match against Nice. He started the match playing 68 minutes before being substituted out. Le Mans lost the match 2–1 with both goals being scored with Corchia off the pitch. The following week, he earned another start against Marseille where he went up against the likes of Mathieu Valbuena, Bolo Zenden, and Hatem Ben Arfa. This was where he had started gaining his reputation. Towards the end of the season, Corchia became the first choice starting all ten matches he appeared in.

On 1 May 2009, Corchia agreed to his first professional contract signing with Le Mans until June 2012. For the 2009–10 season, new manager Paulo Duarte installed Corchia as the first-choice right back for the season. On 12 December, he scored his first professional goal in a 2–1 victory over Valenciennes. In the return fixture against Valenciennes, Corchia scored his second career goal converting a free kick in injury time. The game-winning goal helped Le Mans remain in contention to stay in Ligue 1, though the team was later relegated.

Sochaux
On 30 June 2011, after spending a season playing with Le Mans in the second division, Corchia returned to Ligue 1 joining Sochaux on a four-year contract. The transfer fee was undisclosed. Corchia made his competitive debut for the club in its opening league match of the season against Marseille. In the match, he assisted on the team's opening goal scored by Marvin Martin. The match finished in a 2–2 draw. Sébastien Corchia's first goal came in an away match against Rennes on 23 February 2013.

On 29 January 2014, he signed with Lille OSC with a four-and-a-half-year contract. However, his contract was not officially recognized by the French financial authority in football, due to Lille's financial difficulties, and so he returned to Sochaux.

Lille
On 27 June 2014, Corchia finally joined Lille on a four-year deal after Sochaux had been relegated in the 2013–14 season.

Sevilla
On 13 July 2017, Corchia joined Sevilla on a four-year deal for 7.5 million euros. He was handed the jersey number 2.

On 19 August 2018, Corchia joined Portuguese side Benfica on a season-long loan. He debuted for the Lisbon team in a 3–0 away win over Sertanense in the third round of the Taça de Portugal, on 18 October 2018.

On 21 August 2019, Corchia joined RCD Espanyol on a season-long loan deal which includes a buyout clause.

International career
Sébastien is a French youth international. He has played on the under-17, under-18, and the under-19 team. With the under-17 team, Corchia made his debut in a 2–1 friendly defeat to the Czech Republic appearing as a substitute in the second half for Julien Berthomier. His only other appearance with the team was the return match against the Czech Republic, which ended 1–1. Corchia was a late participant with the under-18 team making his debut in the Slovakia Cup on 28 April 2008 against the hosts. He appeared in all three group stage matches, which is where France suffered elimination.

Corchia was a key participant in the under-19 team that qualified for the 2009 UEFA European Under-19 Football Championship and was named to the tournament playing the full 90 minutes in the squad's opening 1–1 draw with Serbia. He played in all four of the squad's matches including the semi-final, where they suffered elimination losing 1–3 in extra time to England with Corchia receiving a red card. He appeared in all 19 matches the team contested. Corchia is also eligible to represent the country of his father's ancestors, Italy. He has dual citizenship with France and Italy and holds an Italian passport.

On 27 August 2009, Corchia was selected to the under-21 squad, for the first time, for their upcoming 2011 UEFA European Under-21 Football Championship qualification matches against Slovenia on 4 September and the Ukraine on 8 September. Corchia made his debut in the Ukraine match starting in the right back position. France drew the match 1–1. Corchia appeared with the team in the next five matches before dropping out of the selection that was to play in two friendly matches against Argentina in Buenos Aires on 20 and 24 May.

On 25 August 2016, Corchia was called up to the senior squad for the first time for a friendly against Italy and a 2018 FIFA World Cup qualification against Belarus.

Corchia made his debut on 15 November against Ivory Coast, replacing Djibril Sidibé for the final 21 minutes of a 0–0 home draw.

Career statistics

Club

International

Honours
Benfica
Primeira Liga: 2018–19

Nantes
Coupe de France: 2021–22

References

External links

 
 

1990 births
Living people
Footballers from Seine-Saint-Denis
French footballers
France youth international footballers
France under-21 international footballers
France international footballers
Association football defenders
INF Clairefontaine players
Paris Saint-Germain F.C. players
Le Mans FC players
FC Sochaux-Montbéliard players
Lille OSC players
Sevilla FC players
S.L. Benfica footballers
RCD Espanyol footballers
FC Nantes players
Ligue 1 players
Ligue 2 players
La Liga players
Liga Portugal 2 players
Primeira Liga players
French expatriate footballers
Expatriate footballers in Portugal
Expatriate footballers in Spain
French expatriate sportspeople in Portugal
French expatriate sportspeople in Spain
French people of Italian descent